The 1964 Icelandic women's national basketball tournament was the 9th season of the women's tournament in Iceland. The games were played during the weekend 29 February 1964 to 1 March 1964. Skallagrímur won its first title after defeating both Fimleikafélagið Björk and reigning champions Íþróttafélag Reykjavíkur in the tournament.

Competition format
The participating teams played each opponent once for a total of two games. The team with the best record was crowned national champions.

Game results

Regular season

References

External links
Official Icelandic Basketball Federation website

Úrvalsdeild kvenna seasons (basketball)